Eddy-current testing (also commonly seen as eddy current testing and ECT) is one of many electromagnetic testing methods used in nondestructive testing (NDT) making use of electromagnetic induction to detect and characterize surface and sub-surface flaws in conductive materials.

History 
Eddy current testing (ECT) as a technique for testing finds its roots in electromagnetism. Eddy currents were first observed by François Arago in 1824, but French physicist Léon Foucault is credited with discovering them in 1855. ECT began largely as a result of the English scientist Michael Faraday's discovery of electromagnetic induction in 1831. Faraday discovered that when there is a closed path through which current can circulate and a time-varying magnetic field passes through a conductor (or vice versa), an electric current flows through this conductor.

In 1879, another English-born scientist, David Edward Hughes, demonstrated how the properties of a coil change when placed in contact with metals of different conductivity and permeability, which was applied to metallurgical sorting tests.

Much of the development of ECT as a nondestructive testing technique for industrial applications was carried out during World War II in Germany. Professor Friedrich Förster while working for the Kaiser-Wilhelm Institute (now the Kaiser Wilhelm Society) adapted eddy current technology to industrial use, developing instruments measuring conductivity and sorting mixed ferrous components. After the war, in 1948, Förster founded a company, now called the Foerster Group where he made great strides in developing practical ECT instruments and marketing them.

Eddy current testing is now a widely used and well understood inspection technique for flaw detection, as well as thickness and conductivity measurements.

Frost & Sullivan analysis in the global NDT equipment market in 2012 estimated the magnetic and electromagnetic NDT equipment market at $220 million, which includes conventional eddy current, magnetic particle inspection, eddy current array, and remote-field testing. This market is projected to grow at 7.5% compounded annual growth rate to approximately $315 million by 2016.

ECT principle 

In its most basic form — the single-element ECT probe — a coil of conductive wire is excited with an alternating electrical current. This wire coil produces an alternating magnetic field around itself. The magnetic field oscillates at the same frequency as the current running through the coil. When the coil approaches a conductive material, currents opposite to the ones in the coil are induced in the material — eddy currents.

Variations in the electrical conductivity and magnetic permeability of the test object, and the presence of defects causes a change in eddy current and a corresponding change in phase and amplitude that can be detected by measuring the impedance changes in the coil, which is a telltale sign of the presence of defects. This is the basis of standard (pancake coil) ECT. NDT kits can be used in the eddy current testing process.

ECT has a very wide range of applications. Since ECT is electrical in nature, it is limited to conductive material. There are also physical limits to generating eddy currents and depth of penetration (skin depth).

Applications

The two major applications of eddy current testing are surface inspection and tubing inspections. Surface inspection is used extensively in the aerospace industry, but also in the petrochemical industry. The technique is very sensitive and can detect tight cracks. Surface inspection can be performed both on ferromagnetic and non-ferromagnetic materials.

Tubing inspection is generally limited to non-ferromagnetic tubing and is known as conventional eddy current testing. Conventional ECT is used for inspecting steam generator tubing in nuclear plants and heat exchangers tubing in power and petrochemical industries. The technique is very sensitive to detect and size pits. Wall loss or corrosion can be detected but sizing is not accurate.

A variation of conventional ECT for partially magnetic materials  is full saturation ECT. In this technique, permeability variations are suppressed by applying a magnetic field. The saturation probes contain conventional eddy current coils and magnets. This inspection is used on partially ferromagnetic materials such as nickel alloys, duplex alloys, and thin-ferromagnetic materials such as ferritic chromium molybdenum stainless steel. The application of a saturation eddy current technique depends on the permeability of the material, tube thickness, and diameter.

A method used for carbon steel tubing is remote field eddy current testing. This method is sensitive to general wall loss and not sensitive to small pits and cracks.

ECT on surfaces 
When it comes to surface applications, the performance of any given inspection technique depends greatly on the specific conditions — mostly the types of materials and defects, but also surface conditions, etc. However, in most situations, the following are true:

 Effective on coatings/paint: yes
 Computerized record keeping: partial
 3D/Advanced imaging: none
 User dependence: high
 Speed: low
 Post-inspection analysis: none
 Requires chemicals/consumables: no

Other applications 
ECT is also useful in making electrical conductivity and coating thickness measurements, among others.

Other eddy current testing techniques 
To circumvent some of the shortcomings of conventional ECT, other eddy current testing techniques were developed with various successes.

Eddy current array 
Eddy current array (ECA) and conventional ECT share the same basic working principles. ECA technology provides the ability to electronically drive an array of coils ( multiple coils) arranged in specific pattern called a topology that generates a sensitivity profile suited to the target defects. Data acquisition is achieved by multiplexing the coils in a special pattern to avoid mutual inductance between the individual coils. The benefits of ECA are:

 Faster inspections
 Wider coverage
 Less operator dependence — array probes yield more consistent results compared to manual raster scans
 Better detection capabilities
 Easier analysis because of simpler scan patterns
 Improved positioning and sizing because of encoded data
 Array probes can easily be designed to be flexible or shaped to specifications, making hard-to-reach areas easier to inspect

ECA technology provides a remarkably powerful tool and saves significant time during inspections. ECA inspection in carbon steel welds is regulated by ASTM standard E3052.

Lorentz force eddy current testing 

A different, albeit physically closely related challenge is the detection of deeply lying flaws and inhomogeneities in electrically conducting solid materials. 

In the traditional version of eddy current testing an alternating (AC) magnetic field is used to induce eddy currents inside the material to be investigated. If the material contains a crack or flaw which make the spatial distribution of the electrical conductivity nonuniform, the path of the eddy currents is perturbed and the impedance of the coil which generates the AC magnetic field is modified. By measuring the impedance of this coil, a crack can hence be detected. Since the eddy currents are generated by an AC magnetic field, their penetration into the subsurface region of the material is limited by the skin effect. The applicability of the traditional version of eddy current testing is therefore limited to the analysis of the immediate vicinity of the surface of a material, usually of the order of one millimeter. Attempts to overcome this fundamental limitation using low frequency coils and superconducting magnetic field sensors have not led to widespread applications.

A recent technique, referred to as Lorentz force eddy current testing (LET), exploits the advantages of applying DC magnetic fields and relative motion providing deep and relatively fast testing of electrically conducting materials. In principle, LET represents a modification of the traditional eddy current testing from which it differs in two aspects, namely (i) how eddy currents are induced and (ii) how their perturbation is detected. In LET eddy currents are generated by providing the relative motion between the conductor under test and a permanent magnet(see figure). If the magnet is passing by a defect, the Lorentz force acting on it shows a distortion whose detection is the key for the LET working principle. If the object is free of defects, the resulting Lorentz force remains constant.

See also
Eddy current
Nondestructive testing
Alternating current field measurement
Cover Meter
Metal detector
Skin effect

References

External links
  Eddy Current Array Tutorial
  An introduction to eddy current testing from the NDE/NDT resource center
Intro to Eddy Current Testing by Joseph M. Buckley (pdf, 429 kB)
Eddy Current Testing at Level 2, International Atomic Energy Agency, Vienna, 2011 (pdf 5.6 MB).
ASTM E3052 Standard Practice for Examination of Carbon Steel Welds Using Eddy Current Array
Official web page of Lorentz Force Velocimetry and Lorentz Force Eddy Current Testing Group 
Video on eddy current testing, Karlsruhe University of Applied Sciences

Nondestructive testing